Amberley is a suburb in the City of Ipswich, Queensland, Australia.

Geography 
Australia's biggest air force base, the RAAF Base Amberley is situated here and the Bureau of Meteorology has a weather observation station in Amberley. To the south of Amberley is the Fassifern Valley. The Jeebropilly coal mine is located just to the west of Amberley.

History 
The suburb is named after Amberley in the United Kingdom. The name was used by James and Martha Collett for their residence in the 1850s as it was their hometown. Previously the area was known as Three-Mile Creek, referring to it being three miles along on the Old Toowoomba Road from Ipswich.

In 1861, a school commenced at Willowbank on a sheep and cattle station owned by Darby McGrath. McGrath then asked the Queensland Government to take over and donated land for the construction of a new building, resulting in the opening of Warrill Creek State School opened on 22 May 1862 on what is now the south-western part of the RAAF Base Amberley. On 28 January 1888 the school relocated to a new site at Sandridge but it was flooded in 1893 by Warrill Creek. In 1903, it was renamed Amberley State School. This school is one of the oldest state primary schools in Queensland. The outbreak of World War II escalated activity on the air force base and it was decided to close the school at the end of 1941 and it re-opened at the start of 1947. Concerns about aircraft noise at the school lead to the construction of a new school on Rosewood Road further from the base in the late 1970s. On 1 January 2010, the school was again relocated to Deebing Creek Road, Yamanto and renamed Amberley District State School.

In December 1867 a United Methodist Free Church was opened at Three-Mile Creek.

Education 
There are no schools in Amberley. The nearest primary schools are Amberley District State School in neighbouring Yamanto to the east, Walloon State School in neighbouring Walloon to the north-west and Leichhardt State School in neighbouring Leichhardt to the north-east. The nearest secondary schools are Bremer State High School in Ipswich to the east and Rosewood State High School in Rosewood to the north-east.

Climate
Amberley has a humid subtropical climate (Cfa) with hot humid summers and cool, crisp winters that have a high diurnal range which provide frost in some mornings. Its lowest temperature of -4.9 degrees Celsius occurred on the 8 August 1995, when southern Queensland suffered a severe cold snap. The previous coldest temperature was -4.3 degrees reached on 29 July 1994. The town is fairly sunny, receiving 110.3 clear days.

References

External links

 

 
Queensland in World War II
Suburbs of Ipswich, Queensland